Pokrovka is a rural locality (a selo) and the administrative center of Pokrovsky Selsoviet of Klyuchevsky District, Altai Krai, Russia. The population was 481 as of 2016. There are 6 streets.

Geography 
Pokrovka is located 29 km southeast of Klyuchi (the district's administrative centre) by road. Severka is the nearest rural locality.

Ethnicity 
The village is inhabited by Russians and others.

References 

Rural localities in Klyuchevsky District